Grzegorz Miśtal (born 19 January 1973, in Kraków) - Polish movie actor and TV actor, and theater actor. Since 1999 he is reporter of Telewizja Polska. Since September 2009 he is host of Program Kawa Czy Herbata?. He guides too a program: Ktokolwiek widział, ktokolwiek wie.

Filmography
 Spis cudzołożnic (1995), as man in a bar
 Boża podszewka (1997), as AK soldier
 Klan (1997-2007), as Adam Horecki
 Sara (1997), as basketballer
 Ostatnia misja (1999), as desk clerk
 Pierwszy milion (1999), as man in a disco
 Lokatorzy (2001), as Adam
 Na dobre i na złe (2004), as himself
 Rodzinka (2004), as patient

References

External links 
 Grzegorz Miśtal at tvp.pl
 Grzegorz Miśtal at gudejko.pl

1973 births
Living people
Polish male actors